Saint Matthew the Hermit (Arabic: القديس مار متى الناسك;  Mor Mattai) was a 4th-century Christian priest. He is venerated as a saint in the Oriental Orthodox Church and his feast day is 18 September.

Biography
Matthew was born in the early 4th century in a village north of Amida, into a Christian family. He was educated at the Monastery of the Saints Sergius and Bacchus for seven years, after which he became a monk at the Monastery of Zuqnin and was ordained as a priest. Upon the ascension of Emperor Julian the Apostate in 361, and subsequent persecution of Christianity, Matthew and other monks fled to the Sasanian Empire, and took up residence on Mount Alfaf. Matthew practised asceticism in a cave on the mountain and gained renown as a miracle-worker. Having received a dream in which an angel instructed him to seek Matthew, Behnam, son of King Sinharib of Assur, met with the saint and discussed Christianity together. Aware of Matthew's reputation as a miracle-worker, the prince requested he join him on his return to Assur and heal his sister Sarah of leprosy, to which he agreed.

Matthew met with Behnam and Sarah outside of the city of Assur and healed her affliction. Behnam, Sarah, and forty slaves subsequently converted to Christianity and the saint baptised them. Following this, Matthew returned to his cave on Mount Alfaf. Sinharib discovered his children's conversion and the group suffered martyrdom as they attempted to flee to Matthew on Mount Alfaf. The king became afflicted with madness and was brought to the place of the martyrs' death by Behnam's mother. Matthew met Sinharib and the queen here and healed the king of his madness. They returned to Assur and the saint baptised Sinharib and his wife, and, at the request of Matthew, the king constructed a monastery on Mount Alfaf, which later became known as the Monastery of St. Matthew. Matthew resided at the monastery until his death and was buried there.

References

Bibliography

Christians in the Sasanian Empire
4th-century births
4th-century deaths
Oriental Orthodox saints
4th-century Christian saints
4th-century Byzantine monks
Mesopotamian saints
Miracle workers